Hossam Arafat Abdalla Hassan (born on 18 January 1990) is an Egyptian footballer. He currently plays for the Egyptian Premier League side ENPPI.

Professional career

Early career
Arafat started his career at El Mansoura before moving to El Zamalek.

International career
Arafat currently plays for the Egyptian U-20 national youth team. He led the attacking midfield line in the 2009 FIFA U-20 World Cup that was hosted by Egypt from September 25 to October 16.

References

Egyptian footballers
1990 births
Living people
People from Mansoura, Egypt
Zamalek SC players
Egyptian Premier League players
Association football midfielders